Bourbois Township is an inactive township in Gasconade County, in the U.S. state of Missouri.

Bourbois Township was established in 1828, most likely taking its name the Bourbeuse River. Crops like soybeans are planted in the area.

References

Townships in Missouri
Townships in Gasconade County, Missouri